Martha Smith (born 1952) is an American model.

Martha Smith may also refer to:

Martha K. Smith (fl. 1960s–2010s), American mathematician
Martha Nell Smith (fl. 1990s–2010s), professor of English
Martha Pearson Smith (1836-?), American poet, musician, temperance activist

See also
Yeardley Smith (full name Martha Maria Yeardley Smith), American actress, writer and artist